Zolochiv urban territorial hromada is a hromada in Ukraine, in the western Lviv Oblast. Its administrative centre is the city of Zolochiv.

Its total population is 

The hromada was established in 2020, as part of administrative reforms in Ukraine.

Settlements 
In addition to one city (Zolochiv), the hromada includes the following 66 villages:
 Bilyi Kamin
 
 
 Buzhok
 
 Verkhobuzh
 
 Havarechchyna
 
 Holohory
 
 
 
 Hutyshche
 
 
 
 
 Zarvanytsia
 
 
 
 
 
 
 
 
 
 
 
 
 
 
 
 
 
 
 
 
 
 
 
 
 
 Pidlyssia
 
 
 
 
 
 
 
 Sasiv

References 

2020 establishments in Ukraine
Hromadas of Lviv Oblast